Olga Rodríguez Francisco (born 19 December 1975) is a Spanish journalist and author, specialised in the Middle East and human rights.

Biography 
Olga Rodríguez Francisco was born 19 December 1975 in León to journalist parents, she moved to Valladolid as a teenager, later moving to Madrid to study at the university. She earned a licentiate degree in Information Sciences (Journalism) from the Complutense University of Madrid (UCM). She earned early recognition for her chronicles of the Iraq War on Cadena SER, also working for Cuatro and CNN+. She was a direct witness of the killing of Spanish journalist José Couso in April 2003 in the Palestine Hotel of Baghdad. She was also destined in Afghanistan, Egypt, Iran, Lebanon, Yemen, Syria and Jordan. She was one of the co-founders of eldiario.es in 2012 and worked there as press ombudswoman and deputy director. In 2017, after several years of relationship and a daughter in common, she married actor Juan Diego Botto, whom she co-penned the screenplay of the film On the Fringe, shot in 2021.

Works

References

External links 

Spanish journalists
Spanish women journalists
Eldiario.es people
1975 births
Living people